Renfrew County is a county in the Canadian province of Ontario. It stands on the west bank of the Ottawa River. There are 17 municipalities in the county.

History

Bathurst District
When Carleton County was withdrawn from Bathurst District in 1838, Renfrew County was severed from part of the remaining Lanark County, but the two remained united for electoral purposes. By 1845, all lands in the District had been surveyed into the following townships:

United Counties of Lanark and Renfrew
Effective January 1, 1850, Bathurst District was abolished, and the "United Counties of Lanark and Renfrew" replaced it for municipal and judicial purposes. The counties remained united for electoral purposes in the Parliament of the Province of Canada, referred to as the County of Lanark, until Renfrew gained its own seat in 1853.

The separation of Renfrew from Lanark began in 1861, with the creation of a Provisional Municipal Council that held its first meeting in June 1861. The United Counties were dissolved in August 1866.

Geographical evolution
The territory was originally described in 1838 as consisting of:

In 1851, Pakenham was transferred to Lanark, while Renfrew was expanded through the addition of:

In 1860, the newly surveyed townships of Miller and Canonto were transferred to Frontenac County, while the townships of Raglan, Lyndoch, Radcliffe and Brudenell were added to Renfrew. The final expansion of the County occurred in 1877-1878, with the transfer of the United Townships of Hagarty, Sherwood, Jones, Richards and Burns, and the United Townships of Head, Clara and Maria, from Nipissing District.

Once all lands had been surveyed, the County consisted of the following townships:

Municipal reorganization (2001)

The county seat, Pembroke, is a separated municipality.

Geography

Renfrew County is known for its lakeside cottages and white-water rafting along the Ottawa River, and has more than 900 lakes. It is located in the primary region of Southern Ontario and the secondary region Eastern or Southeastern Ontario. Renfrew County is also the largest county in terms of area in Ontario, ahead of Hastings County.

Demographics

Arts and culture

At Wilno, Ontario Canada's Kashubian community celebrates their heritage.

Military
The county is home to CFB Petawawa and gives its name to The Lanark and Renfrew Scottish Regiment.

Notable people
 Silver Quilty, Canada's Sports Hall of Fame inductee

See also
 List of numbered roads in Renfrew County
 List of municipalities in Ontario
 List of Ontario counties
 Renfrew County municipal elections, 2010
 List of townships in Ontario
 List of secondary schools in Ontario#Renfrew County

References

External links
 

 
Counties in Ontario